MediaOne Academy is a media institute in Kerala, India. It was established by Madhyamam Broadcasting Limited in 2010. The institute is situated in Velliparamba, Calicut. It mainly runs courses in electronic, print and new media.

MediaOne Academy is a sister organisation of Media One TV ."The Burning Ghats" a film produced by MediaOne Academy got selected to National Science Film Festival-2014 organised by Vigyan Prasar, Dept of Science and Technology and NCSM. The student diploma film “Human Island” produced by Fasilul Farisa, a student of MediaOne Academy received Bronze Beaver Award at National Science Festival organised byDept of Science and Technology and National Council of Science Museums. The festival was held at Lucknow on 4–8 February 2015. “Victim of Laurel” produced by MBL Students Ashhab Ayoob and Mansoor Ali received best non-fiction film award at Campus Film Festival 2015 organised by FILCA & C-DIT. Ijas Muhammed, a student of PG Diploma in TV Programme Production course won Saratchandran Memorial Award for the best documentary for his documentary film “Unity Yet Diversity” at Youth Spring Film Festival 2014, Calicut. Ahammed Naseeb another student of MediaOne Academy won best cinematographer award for the same film. Former student of MediaOne Academy Mr. Sajid Ajmal who is presently working as Broadcast Journalist @ MediaOne TV got Best Investigative Journalist award from Government of Kerala. The MediaOne Academy, in association with the Vigyan Prasar, Department of Science and Technology, Government of India, organised a five-day national science communication workshop at its campus on September 14–18, 2015. The MediaOne Academy in collaboration with Pedestrian Pictures and Crown Cinema organizes screening of Documentary films, short films and music albums at Crown Theatre, Calicut once in every month.

Courses Offered

Post Graduate Programmes

 PG Diploma in Convergence Journalism
 PG Diploma in Visual Communication

Graduate Programmes

Bachelor's Degree in Multimedia and Communication

Certificate Courses

 Non-Linear Editing
 Electronic Cinematography
 Photography
 Broadcast Engineering
 Television Graphics
 New Media and Web Journalism
 News Anchoring

References

External links
 http://mediaoneacademy.com/
 https://www.youtube.com/watch?v=5fDCHXJJM5w

Communications and media organisations based in India
Colleges in Kerala